Vomeronasal type-1 receptor 5 is a protein that in humans is encoded by the VN1R5 gene.

References

Further reading

G protein-coupled receptors